Omar is the debut studio album from  Slovenian singer Omar Naber. It was released in 2005 on CD and MC (cassette) with different track listings on each format.  It is not quite clear why this was done, however in many cases it is usually because of spacing on both sides of the cassette, whereas on a CD it doesn't really matter.  There are however the same tracks on both formats. The tracks on the album are mainly in Slovenian, however there are four English language versions of tracks already in Slovenian. As with a few albums of this nature, the album was redone with most of the songs rerecorded in Serbian, along with two songs in English, in order to appeal to Serbian speaking audiences.  This version also featured a slightly different track listing.

Singles
"Vse, kar si želiš" was released as the lead single from the album. "Stop" was released as the second single from the album. The song represented Slovenia in the Eurovision Song Contest 2005 semi final and it was recorded twice with different orchestration.  The second version was the orchestration used at the Eurovision, this version appears on the official Eurovision Song Contest 2005 compilation CD, but not on any version of this album.  It does however appear on Omar's 2007 album Kareem. The song was also recorded in English, however as well as different orchestration, there were different lyrics.  The original recording was called "On My Own" and the re-recording was called "Go". The Serbian edition of this album featured "Stop" in Croatian, not Serbian.  It also features "Go" as opposed to "On My Own", which does not appear on the original CD or MC release. "Omar, ti teslo", "Polje tvojih sanj", "Skrivaj sanjava", "Ves tvoj svet" and "Krasen dan" were released as singles from the album.

Track listing

Release history

References

2005 debut albums
Pop albums by Slovenian artists
Slovene-language albums